Stepfather III (also known as Stepfather III: Father's Day) is a 1992 American thriller film directed and written by Guy Magar. It stars Robert Wightman, Priscilla Barnes, David Tom, and Season Hubley. It is the second sequel to 1987 film The Stepfather and a follow up to 1989 film Stepfather II. The film follows a serial killer seeking out another family to become a part of, using plastic surgery to disguise himself from the authorities. Unlike the previous two installments, Stepfather III was released made-for-television and Terry O'Quinn does not star in the titular role.

Plot 

Having survived the stab wounds he sustained in Palm Meadows, Los Angeles at the end of the previous film, Gene Clifford (Robert Wightman) escapes from the same institution in Puget Sound, Washington he was placed in four years ago. He seeks out a back alley plastic surgeon (Mario Roccuzzo) to alter his appearance, using no anesthesia. After a few days, Gene kills the doctor by slitting his throat with a bone saw and makes his way to Deer View, California, where he acquires a new identity, "Keith Grant", as well as a small cottage and a job at a plant nursery. Nine months after crafting his new life, Keith, during an Easter dance held by the church, meets divorced school principal Christine Davis (Priscilla Barnes) and her psychosomatically paralyzed son Andy (David Tom). Keith and Christine begin dating. When Christine's possessive ex-boyfriend Mark Wraynal (Stephen Mendel) follows Keith home and confronts him, Keith offers to have a chat. Keith kills him with a shovel and buries the body in his garden.

Keith and Christine marry, despite Andy's misgivings. Andy's biological father Steve (Jay Acovone) offers Andy the chance to spend the summer with his family and attend a school for the gifted, and Andy decides to take his father up on the offer, despite Keith's protests. With Andy gone and Christine revealed to be infertile, Keith begins courting Jennifer Ashley (Season Hubley), a widow who has moved into Keith's old cottage with her son Nicholas (Adam Ryen). Keith plans to murder Christine and marry Jennifer. Keith murders his boss, Mr. Thompson (Dennis Paladino), with a rake when Thompson teases him about spotting Keith cheating on Christine with Jennifer. When Andy sees a news story about an unidentified serial killer who murders families, and suspecting that Keith is the culprit, he fakes homesickness to return home. Keith returns home with an axe to kill Christine, only to find Andy in bed. Keith calls Andy "Nicky" which makes Christine suspicious, though Keith gives her an explanation. The next day Jennifer meets Christine while enrolling Nicky in school. Keith stops by the school and sees them together and panics.

Andy asks family friend Father Ernest Brennan (John Ingle) to help him discover Keith's past. While cooking dinner for Father Brennan, Christine asks Keith if he knows Jennifer, but he denies it. Christine grows more suspicious since she knows Jennifer is renting Keith's cottage.  Andy and Father Brennan sneak Keith's fork off the dinner table, to have the fingerprints analyzed. Realizing Brennan is up to something, Keith excuses himself after dinner and follows the priest home. He runs Brennan off the road, beats him to death, and makes it look like a car accident. He also discovers the fork.

When Christine mentions visiting Jennifer, Keith rushes to the plant nursery and calls Jennifer, telling her to meet him. Before going to the nursery Jennifer calls Christine to cancel their meeting, claiming her new boyfriend called with an emergency. When Jennifer arrives, Keith reveals he is married before claiming he needs her out of the way. Keith knocks her unconscious and prepares to kill her by feeding her body into a big wood chipper.

Christine and Andy suddenly appear; Christine has figured out that Keith is Jennifer's new boyfriend and confronts him about the affair. He beats her unconscious when she discovers Jennifer weakly writhing on the ground. As Keith prepares to murder his two lovers, Andy finds the courage to get out of his wheelchair and walk. Keith chases him through the nursery until Andy pushes him off the ladder which knocks him into the wood chipper. However, Keith is only hanging on the edge and grabs Andy. Christine gets up and helps Andy get away, leaving Keith to fall into the wood chipper, killing him. Jennifer cuts the cable with a hatchet, when the wood chipper’s engine suddenly shuts off. Jennifer sees the body pieces of Keith in the blood-covered wood chipper. Andy stands up and Christine is surprised and hugs him. As they walk away, Andy turns around and looks at the bloody wood chipper and says, "Happy Father's Day, slugger." They then exit the garden.

Cast 

 Robert Wightman as Gene Clifford / Keith Grant / The Stepfather 
 Priscilla Barnes as Christine Davis
 Season Hubley as Jennifer Ashley
 David Tom as Andy Davis
 John Ingle as Father Ernest Thomas Brennan
 Dennis Paladino as Mr. Thompson
 Stephen Mendel as Mark Wraynal
 Jay Acovone as Steve Davis
 Christa Miller as Beth Davis
 Mario Roccuzzo as Plastic Surgeon
 Joan Dareth as Bernice
 Jennifer Bassey as Dr. Brady
 Adam Ryen as Nicholas "Nicky" Ashley
 Mindy Ann Martin as Tiffany Davis
 Joel Carlson as Pete Davis
 Sumer Stamper as Maggie Davis
 Brenda Strong as Lauren Sutliffe
 Mort Lewis as Funeral Priest
 Adam Wylie as Easter Party Boy

Production

Filming 
For the opening scene in which Gene Clifford undergoes plastic surgery, director Guy Magar filmed an actual plastic surgery procedure, with no special effects used during the scene. The film was shot over the course of 25 days in Los Angeles with a budget of $1.8 million.

Release

Home media 
To date, the only DVD release of the film has been in Germany, where Marketing Films released it as a part of a limited edition box set containing the other two installments of the series in 2003. It was also released in Germany separately. Elsewhere, the only home video release of the film is on VHS. No plans have been made to release it on DVD or Blu-ray in the United States.

Reception

Critical response 

Reviews of the film were varied, with Variety's Tony Scott stating "[The] film lurches on without much credibility" before going on to say "blood spurts, but director (and co-writer with Marc B. Ray) Guy Magar doesn't make the horror convincing. The simplistic story line and the unconvincing portrayal by Wightman haven't been enhanced by indifferent production values." Entertainment Weekly's Doug Brod gave the film a D+, referring to it as "a poorly scripted, all-too-familiar chiller", also calling Robert Wightman "robotic" and "a weak substitute for previous death-dealing dad Terry O'Quinn".

Time Out Film Guide stated that the film "is far better than one might expect" and called Wightman's performance "more barmy than ever" and "with that prissy, scary, whiny voice makes a good fist of it".

References

External links 
 
 

1992 films
1992 horror films
1992 television films
1990s psychological thriller films
American horror television films
American sequel films
Films set in California
Films shot in Los Angeles
HBO Films films
American serial killer films
American psychological horror films
1990s English-language films
Films directed by Guy Magar
1990s American films